Central Africans in the United States are Americans with ancestry from Central Africa. They include:

 Cameroonian Americans
 Congolese Americans
 Equatoguinean Americans
 Gabonese Americans
 São Toméan Americans
 Burundian Americans
 Central African Americans
 Rwandese Americans

See also
Central Africa